Sir Nicholas Grimshaw, CBE, PPRA (born 9 October 1939) is a prominent English architect, particularly noted for several modernist buildings, including London's Waterloo International railway station and the Eden Project in Cornwall. He was President of the Royal Academy from 2004 to 2011. He was chairman of Grimshaw Architects (formerly Nicholas Grimshaw & Partners) from its foundation to 2019, when he was succeeded by Andrew Whalley. He is a recipient of the RIBA Gold Medal.

Biography

Grimshaw was born in Hove, East Sussex 9 October 1939.  His father was an engineer, and his mother a portrait painter and he inherited an interest in engineering and art. One of his great-grandfathers was a civil engineer who built dams in Egypt, and another was a physician who campaigned for the installation of Dublin's drainage and sanitation system after showing a link between waterborne diseases and streams joining River Liffey. His father died when he was two and a half, and he grew up with his mother, grandmother who was also a portrait painter, and two sisters in Guildford. He displayed an early interest in construction; his boyhood interests included Meccano, building tree houses and boats.

He was educated at Wellington College, and left when he was 17. From 1959 to 1962, he studied at the Edinburgh College of Art before winning a scholarship to attend the Architectural Association School of Architecture in London, where he won further scholarships to travel to Sweden in 1963 and the United States in 1964. He graduated from the AA in 1965 with an honours diploma, and having entered into a partnership with Terry Farrell, he joined the Royal Institute of British Architects two years later in 1967.

He worked with Farrell for 15 years before establishing his own firm, Nicholas Grimshaw & Partners, in 1980. In 1989, he won a Royal Institute of British Architects national award for his design of the Financial Times printworks in East London. After designing Britain's pavilion for the Seville Expo in 1992, he was appointed a CBE in 1993, and the following year saw his Waterloo railway terminal awarded the accolade of 'Building of the Year'. That same year (1994) also saw him elected a vice-chairman of the Architectural Association, a member of the Royal Academy and a member of the American Institute of Architects.

Grimshaw's architecture practice continues to grow; it has a global profile, with offices in London, New York, Melbourne and Sydney. The work of Nicholas Grimshaw & Partners was the subject of a series of monographs published by Phaidon Press: Architecture, Industry and Innovation deals with the years 1965–1988; Structure Space and Skin covers 1988–1993; and Equilibrium looks at work up until 2000.

In December 2004, Grimshaw was elected President of the Royal Academy of Arts, a position he held until 2011.
Grimshaw is behind the National Institute for Research into Aquatic Habitats (NIRAH) design.

Projects

Projects include:
 125 Park Road, London (1968); joint project with Terry Farrell
 Herman Miller Factory, Bath (1976); joint project with Terry Farrell
 BMW (UK) headquarters, Bracknell (1980)
 Oxford Ice Rink, Oxford (1984)
 Clifton Hill Sports Centre, Exeter (1984)
 Financial Times Printworks, Blackwall, London (1988)
 Rank Xerox Research Centre, Welwyn Garden City (1988)
 J. Sainsbury's supermarket, Camden Town, London (1988)
 Stockbridge Leisure Centre, Liverpool (1988)
 British Pavilion Expo '92, Seville, Spain (1992)
 Waterloo International railway station, London (1993)
 British Airways Combined Centre of Operations ('The Compass Centre'), Heathrow Airport (1993)
 South West Media Group (Western Morning News, Plymouth Herald) Headquarters and Printworks. Known as "The Ship", Derriford, Plymouth (1993)
 RAC Regional Headquarters, Bristol (1994)
 Pier 4A, Heathrow Airport, (1994)
 Berlin Stock Exchange, Berlin, Germany (1997)
 Lord's Cricket Ground Grandstand, London (1998)
 Heathrow Terminal 3 (1998)
 North Woolwich pumping station, London Docklands (1998)
 Bilbao Bus Station, Bilbao, Spain (1999)
 Eden Project, Cornwall, (2001)
 Frankfurt Trade Fair Hall, Frankfurt, Germany (2001)
 Enneus Heerma Bridge, Amsterdam, Netherlands (2001)
 National Space Centre, Leicester (2001)
 25 Gresham Street, London (2003)
 Rolls-Royce Motor Cars Goodwood manufacturing plant and Headquarters (2003)
 Five Boats, Duisburg, Germany (2005)
 Zurich Airport Expansion (2004)
 The Core, Eden Project (2005)
 Southern Cross railway station, Melbourne, Australia (2005)
 Caixa Galicia Art Gallery, A Coruña, Spain (2006)
 Thermae Bath Spa, Bath (2006)
 Experimental Media and Performing Arts Center, Troy, New York (2007)
 igus Headquarters and Factory, Cologne, Germany (2000)
 University College London Cancer Institute, England (2007)
 London School of Economics New Academic Building, England (2008)
 Pulkovo Airport, St Petersburg, Russia (2007)
 London South Bank University K2 Building, England (2010)
 Eco Hotel Concept, North America (2011)
 The St Botolph Building, London, England (2011)
 Mobilizarte Mobile Pavilion, Brazil (2012)
 The Cutty Sark conservation project, London, England (2012)
Pulkovo Airport, Saint Petersburg, Russia (2014)

Awards and honours 
Grimshaw was made a Knight Bachelor in the 2002 New Year Honours for services to architecture. He received an Honorary Doctorate from Heriot-Watt University in 2004. He received the RIBA Royal Gold Medal in 2019.

References

External links

 

1939 births
Alumni of the Architectural Association School of Architecture
Alumni of the Edinburgh College of Art
Living people
Modernist architects from England
People from Hove
People educated at Wellington College, Berkshire
Royal Academicians
Knights Bachelor
Commanders of the Order of the British Empire